Takydromus intermedius is a species of lizard in the family Lacertidae. It is endemic to China.

References

Takydromus
Reptiles described in 1924
Endemic fauna of China
Reptiles of China
Taxa named by Leonhard Stejneger